Slutsky is a Belarusian, Russian, and Ashkenazi Jewish surname that derived from Slutsk in Belarus. The Jewish family name 'Slutsky' is an Ashkenazized form of  It is shared by the following people:
Abram Slutsky (1898–1938), Jewish Ukrainian Soviet head of the foreign intelligence service (GUGB)
Allan Slutsky, known as "Dr. Licks" (born 1953, Philadelphia, Pennsylvania), a Jewish American arranger
Boris Slutsky (1919, Slovyansk, Ukraine - 1986), Jewish Ukrainian-Soviet poet
Erik Slutsky (born 1953), Jewish Canadian contemporary, figurative painter
Eugen Slutsky (also Yevgeny Evgenievich Slutsky, 1880–1948), Ukrainian-Russian/Soviet mathematical statistician, economist and political economist
Slutsky equation
Slutsky's theorem
Irina Slutsky, American internet video personality
Irina Slutskaya, Russian figure skater
Leonid Slutsky (football manager) (born 1971), Russian association football manager
Leonid Slutsky (politician) (born 1968), member of the State Duma of Russia
Marc Slutsky, drummer for Splender

Slutzky
Meir Amit, born Meir Slutsky (1921–2009), high-ranking Israeli intelligence officer, politician and cabinet minister
Naum Slutzky (1894-1965), a Jewish Ukrainian-German/UK goldsmith, Industrial designer and master craftsman of Weimarer Bauhaus
Richard C. Slutzky, a member of both the Maryland, USA and National Wrestling Halls of Fame
Robert Slutzky (1929-2005), American painter and architectural theorist

See also
Slutsky District, name of Pavlovsky District of Leningrad Oblast in 1938–1944

Russian-language surnames
Slavic-language surnames
Jewish surnames
Surnames of Belarusian origin